George Stafford may refer to:
 George Stafford (musician), American jazz drummer
 George Stafford (rugby league), rugby league footballer of the 1920s and 1930s
 George Stafford (footballer) (1930–2010), Australian rules footballer
 George M. Stafford (1915–1995), chairman of the Interstate Commerce Commission